Sant Cugat Sesgarrigues is a municipality in the comarca of Alt Penedès, in the province of Barcelona, Catalonia, Spain.

Entities 
The AEK Sant Cugat is the indoor soccer club founded in 1989.

References

External links
 Government data pages 

Municipalities in Alt Penedès